Michael Raml (born 2 August 1987) is an Austrian politician who has been a Member of the Federal Council for the Freedom Party of Austria (FPÖ) since 2015.

References

1987 births
Living people
Members of the Federal Council (Austria)
Freedom Party of Austria politicians